William Nicolson Cuthbert (24 August 1890 – 7 May 1960) was a Conservative Party politician in England.

He was elected at the 1945 general election as Member of Parliament (MP) for Rye, and when that constituency was abolished for the 1950 general election, he was returned to the House of Commons for the new Arundel & Shoreham constituency.

He made his maiden speech in the 1945 Budget debate on the National Debt. His final substantive speech was in November 1950 in the King's Speech debate although he made contributions as questions up to his final year in office. 

He resigned his seat on 15 January 1954, by the procedural device of accepting an appointment as Steward of the Chiltern Hundreds. He was succeeded as MP by Captain Henry Kerby.

References

External links 
 

1890 births
1960 deaths
Conservative Party (UK) MPs for English constituencies
UK MPs 1945–1950
UK MPs 1950–1951
UK MPs 1951–1955